Mayumi (まゆみ, マユミ) is a common Japanese given name, particularly for females.

Possible writings
Mayumi can be written using different kanji characters and can mean:
真弓 or 眞弓, "truth, bow" or "spindle tree"
檀, "spindle tree"
雅弓, "elegant, bow"
真由美 or 眞由美, "truth, reason, beauty"
麻由美, "linen, reason, beauty"
真有美, "truth, exist, beauty"
真優美, "truth, gentle, beauty"

The name can also be written in hiragana or katakana.

People

Given name 
Mayumi Aoki (まゆみ) a Japanese swimmer
Mayumi Asaka (真由美), a Japanese actress
Mayumi Asano (まゆみ), a Japanese voice actress
Mayumi Azuma (まゆみ), a Japanese manga artist
Mayumi Gojo (born 1972), a Japanese singer
Mayumi Heene, see Balloon boy hoax
Mayumi Hachiya (真由美), Kim Hyon-hui's Japanese cover name
Mayumi Hidaka (真弓), a Japanese actress
Mayumi Horikawa (まゆみ), a Japanese model and singer-songwriter
Mayumi Iizuka (雅弓), a Japanese voice actress and J-pop singer
Mayumi Ichikawa (真弓), a Japanese long-distance runner
Mayumi Itsuwa (真弓), a Japanese female singer
Mayumi Moriyama (真弓), a Japanese politician
Mayumi Narita (真由美), a Japanese swimmer
Mayumi Ogawa (眞由美), a Japanese actress
Mayumi Ozaki (魔弓), a Japanese female professional wrestler
Mayumi Raheem, a Sri Lankan swimmer
Mayumi Sada (真由美), a Japanese actress
Mayumi Shō (born 1965), a Japanese voice actress
Mayumi Shintani (真弓), a Japanese voice actress and actress
Mayumi Suzuki (まゆみ), a Japanese voice actress
Mayumi Tanaka (真弓, born 1955), a Japanese voice actress
Mayumi Wakamura (麻由美), a Japanese actress
, Japanese sprinter
Mayumi Yamaguchi (眞弓, born 1975), a Japanese voice actress
Mayumi Yamamoto (disambiguation), multiple people
Mayumi Yoshida (真弓), a Japanese voice actress

Fictional characters
Mayumi (マユミ), a character in the Psychiatrist Irabu series of short stories
Mayumi, a character in the film Urduja
Mayumi Kino (真弓), a character in the manga and OVA Blue Submarine No. 6
Mayumi Kubota (真弓), a character in the Nickelodeon/Netflix series Glitch Techs
Mayumi Kinniku (真弓), a male character in the comic Kinnikuman and its sequel Ultimate Muscle
Mayumi Tendo (真弓), a character in the novel, comic and film Battle Royale
Mayumi Thyme (真弓), a character in the visual novel SHUFFLE!
Mayumi Saegusa (真由美), a character in the light novel series The Irregular at Magic High School
Mayumi Joutouguu (磨弓), a character in the video game Touhou Kikeijuu: Wily Beast and Weakest Creature

See also 
Mayumi (disambiguation)

Japanese feminine given names